The cribriform fascia, fascia cribrosa also Hesselbach's fascia is the portion of fascia covering the saphenous opening in the thigh. It is perforated by the great saphenous vein and by numerous blood and lymphatic vessels. (A structure in anatomy that is pierced by several small holes is referred to as cribriform from Latin cribrum meaning sieve).

Clinical significance
The cribriform fascia has been proposed for use in preventing new vascularization when surgery is performed at the join between the great saphenous vein and the femoral vein.

Eponym
When the eponym is used, it is named for Franz Kaspar Hesselbach.

References

Lower limb anatomy
Fascia